The extinct penguin Palaeospheniscus wimani is a member of the genus Palaeospheniscus, which belonged to the prehistoric subfamily Palaeospheniscinae. It was the largest member of its genus, being just as large as the Magellanic penguin of today (to which it is quite unrelated).

Description 
A fairly large number of fossil bones has been found, some of which are tentatively assigned to this species. They are from the Early Miocene Gaiman Formation. The specimens from known localities were collected near Trelew and Gaiman in Chubut Province, Argentina. As there is not much notable difference apart from size, this species is sometimes considered a synonym of Palaeospheniscus patagonicus.

Carl Wiman is honored by the binomen wimani. He was one of the foremost researcher of prehistoric penguins in the early 20th century.

References

Further reading 
 Amegino, Florentino (1905): Enumeracion de los impennes fósiles de Patagonia y de la Isla Seymour. An. Mus. Nac. Buenos Aires 3(6): 97-167, 4 figures, 8 plates.
 Simpson, George Gaylord (1946): Fossil penguins. Bull. Am. Mus. Nat. Hist. 87: 7-99. PDF fulltext
 Simpson, George Gaylord (1971): Conspectus of Patagonian fossil penguins. American Museum Novitates 2488: 1-37. PDF fulltext

Palaeospheniscus
Extinct penguins
Miocene birds of South America
Deseadan
Colhuehuapian
Neogene Argentina
Fossils of Argentina
Gaiman Formation
Fossil taxa described in 1905
Taxa named by Florentino Ameghino